Peligroso is a studio album released by Venezuelan singer-songwriter Carlos Baute through Warner Music on November 9, 2004. The album was recorded in Los Angeles, California, and produced by Humberto Gatica.

Track listing

Release history

External links
Web oficial de Carlos Baute

References

2004 albums
Carlos Baute albums